William C. Stratton was a Democratic politician from California who served in the California State Assembly from the 17th district, serving between 1857 and 1861 and being reelected once. In 1859, he served as the Assembly's 10th Speaker. After retiring from the State Assembly he served as the California State Librarian between 1861 and 1870.

References 

|-

1824 births
Year of death missing
Speakers of the California State Assembly